Jan Drabina (born 1939, in Cieszyn) is Polish historian, professor at the Jagiellonian University.

He graduated from the Jagiellonian University in 1964 and gained a Ph.D. from the University of Silesia in 1969. In 1993 Drabina gained the title of professor. He is an honorary citizen of Bytom.

Works 
"Kontakty Wrocławia z Rzymem w latach 1409-1517", Wrocław 1981
"Idee koncyliaryzmu na Śląsku", Kraków 1984
"Rola argumentacji religijnej w walce politycznej w późnośredniowiecznym Wrocławiu", Kraków 1984
"Religie na ziemiach Polski i Litwy w średniowieczu", Kraków 1989
"Życie codzienne w miastach śląskich XIV i XV wieku", Opole 1991
"Historia Gliwic" (ed.), Gliwice 1995
"Historia Chorzowa", Chorzów 1998
"Historia Tarnowskich Gór" (ed.), tarnowskie Góry 2000
"Historia Bytomia 1254-2000", Bytom 2000
"Kontakty papiestwa z Polską w latach Schizmy Zachodniej 1378-1415", Kraków 2003
"Górny Śląsk"
"Philosophical Problems in the Religions of the East"
"Wierzenia, Religie, Wspolnoty Wyznaniowe W Sredniowiecznej Polsce I Na Litwie I Ich Koegzystencja"
"Bytom, Na Starych Planach I Poczto Wkach"
"Chrzescijanstwo Antyczne"
"Kontakty Wrocławia z Rzymem w latach 1409-1517"
"Historia miast śląskich w średniowieczu"
"Religie a Wojna I Terroryzm"
"Eschatologia W Religiach, Kulturach I Systemach Myslowych"
"Prawosawie"
"Koscioy Wschodnie"
"Cmentarze Bytomskie: Od Sredniowiecza Do Wspoczesnosci"
"Historia Chorzowa: Od Sredniowiecza Do 1868 Roku"
"Religie starożytnego Bliskiego Wschodu"

References 
 
 Elektroniczny Słownik Biograficzny Śląska Cieszyńskiego 
 Jan Drabina’s books

Living people
20th-century Polish historians
Polish male non-fiction writers
1939 births
People from Cieszyn Silesia
Jagiellonian University alumni
University of Silesia in Katowice alumni
Academic staff of Jagiellonian University